These are the official results of the Women's 400 metres event at the 1990 European Championships in Split, Yugoslavia, held at Stadion Poljud on 27, 28, and 29 August 1990.

Medalists

Results

Final
29 August

Semi-finals
28 August

Semi-final 1

Semi-final 2

Heats
27 August

Heat 1

Heat 2

Heat 3

Heat 4

Participation
According to an unofficial count, 26 athletes from 12 countries participated in the event.

 (3)
 (1)
 (3)
 (3)
 (1)
 (1)
 (3)
 (2)
 (2)
 (3)
 (3)
 (1)

See also
 1988 Women's Olympic 400 metres (Seoul)
 1991 Women's World Championships 400 metres (Tokyo)
 1992 Women's Olympic 400 metres (Barcelona)

References

 Results

400
400 metres at the European Athletics Championships
1990 in women's athletics